The 2017 Wisconsin Badgers football team represented the University of Wisconsin–Madison in the 2017 NCAA Division I FBS football season. The Badgers, led by third-year head coach Paul Chryst, were members of the West Division of the Big Ten Conference and played their home games at Camp Randall Stadium in Madison, Wisconsin.

Coming off a Cotton Bowl-winning season in 2016, the 2017 team began the year ranked ninth in the preseason AP Poll and were the favorites to repeat as West Division champions and return to the Big Ten Championship Game. The Badgers fulfilled that expectation by winning all 12 of their regular season games, including wins over ranked opponents Iowa and Michigan. They entered the 2017 Big Ten Championship Game ranked third in the AP Poll, with a potential spot in the College Football Playoff on the line, but fell to No. 8 Ohio State, 21–27. Wisconsin was invited to the Orange Bowl, where they defeated Miami (FL). Their 13 wins were the most in school history.

The Badgers were led on offense by freshman running back Jonathan Taylor, who led the Big Ten and was third in FBS in rushing yards with 1,977 yards. He was named Big Ten Freshman of the Year and first-team All-Big Ten. Quarterback Alex Hornibrook finished with 2,644 passing yards and 25 touchdowns. On defense, linebacker T. J. Edwards was named a first-team All-American by the Associated Press and ESPN.

Recruiting

Recruits

The Badgers signed a total of 18 recruits.

Watchlists and preseason awards
 Michael Deiter

 Rimington Trophy
 Troy Fumagalli
 John Mackey Award

Schedule
Wisconsin's 2017 schedule consisted of 7 home and 5 away games in the regular season. The Badgers hosted Big Ten foes Northwestern, Purdue, Maryland, Iowa, and Michigan, while traveling to Nebraska, Illinois, Indiana, and Minnesota.

The team also played three non–conference games: the Utah State Aggies from the Mountain West Conference (MWC), the Florida Atlantic Owls from Conference USA, and the FBS independent BYU Cougars 

Schedule Source:

Game summaries

Utah State

Statistical Leaders
 Rushing: Jonathan Taylor – 9 carries, 87 yards (long 41), 9.7 yards/carry, 1 touchdown
 Passing: Alex Hornibrook – 15 completions, 23 passing attempts, 244 yards, 16.3 avg, 3 touchdowns
 Receiving: Troy Fumagalli – 5 receptions, 105 yards (long 44), 21.0 avg, 1 touchdown
 Defense: T. J. Edwards – 7 Tackles (5 solo), 1 tackle-for-loss for 1 yd, 2 pass breakups, 1 interception for 7 yds

Florida Atlantic

Statistical Leaders
 Rushing: Jonathan Taylor – 26 carries, 223 yards (long 64), 8.6 yards/carry, 3 touchdowns
 Passing: Alex Hornibrook – 16 completions, 28 passing attempts, 201 yards, 12.6 avg, 1 touchdown, 1 interception
 Receiving: Troy Fumagalli – 8 receptions, 92 yards (long 20), 11.5 avg, 1 touchdown
 Defense: Chris Orr – 8 Tackles (6 solo), 1 tackle-for-loss for 3 yds, 1 sack for loss of 3 yds

at BYU

Statistical Leaders
 Rushing: Jonathan Taylor – 18 carries, 128 yards (long 18), 7.1 yards/carry, 1 touchdown
 Passing: Alex Hornibrook – 18 completions, 19 passing attempts, 256 yards, 14.2 avg, 4 touchdowns
 Receiving: Quintez Cephus – 5 receptions, 54 yards (long 16), 10.8 avg, 2 touchdowns
 Defense: Dontye Carriere-Williams – 8 Tackles (6 solo), 1 interception for 0 yds

Northwestern

Statistical Leaders
 Rushing: Jonathan Taylor – 19 carries, 80 yards (long 11), 4.2 yards/carry, 2 touchdowns
 Passing: Alex Hornibrook – 11 completions, 20 passing attempts, 197 yards, 17.9 avg, 1 touchdown, 2 interceptions
 Receiving: Quintez Cephus – 4 receptions, 99 yards (long 61), 24.6 avg
 Defense: Garret Dooley – 9 Tackles (3 solo), 5 tackles-for-loss for 20 yds, 3.5 sacks for loss of 17 yds

at Nebraska

Statistical Leaders
 Rushing: Jonathan Taylor – 25 carries, 249 yards (long 75), 10.0 yards/carry, 2 touchdowns
 Passing: Alex Hornibrook – 9 completions, 17 passing attempts, 113 yards, 12.6 avg, 1 touchdown, 1 interception
 Receiving: Quintez Cephus – 4 receptions, 68 yards (long 31), 17.0 avg, 1 touchdown
 Defense: D'Cota Dixon – 9 Tackles (6 solo), 1 pass breakup

Purdue

Sources:

Statistical Leaders
 Rushing: Jonathan Taylor – 30 carries, 219 yards (long 67), 7.3 yards/carry, 1 touchdown
 Passing: Alex Hornibrook – 13 completions, 18 passing attempts, 199 yards, 15.3 avg, 1 touchdown, 2 interceptions
 Receiving: Quintez Cephus – 5 receptions, 100 yards (long 41), 20.0 avg, 1 touchdown
 Defense: Leon Jacobs – 9 Tackles (4 solo), 0.5 tackle-for-loss for 1 yd, 1 interception for 2 yds, 1 QB hurry

Maryland

Statistical Leaders
 Rushing: Jonathan Taylor – 22 carries, 126 yards (long 15), 5.7 yards/carry, 1 touchdown
 Passing: Alex Hornibrook – 16 completions, 24 passing attempts, 225 yards, 14.1 avg, 2 touchdowns, 1 interception
 Receiving: Troy Fumagalli – 7 receptions, 83 yards (long 20), 11.9 avg
 Defense: T. J. Edwards – 5 Tackles (3 solo), 1 interception return 54 yds for a touchdown, 1 pass breakup

at Illinois

Statistical Leaders
 Rushing: Jonathan Taylor – 12 carries, 73 yards (long 29), 6.1 yards/carry
 Passing: Alex Hornibrook – 10 completions, 19 passing attempts, 135 yards, 13.5 avg, 1 interception
 Receiving: Kendric Pryor – 2 receptions, 37 yards (long 19), 18.5 avg
 Defense: Garret Dooley – 5 Tackles (3 solo), 1 tackle-for-loss for 6 yds, 1 sack for 6 yd loss, 1 forced fumble, 1 pass breakup

at Indiana

Statistical Leaders
 Rushing: Jonathan Taylor – 29 carries, 183 yards (long 45), 6.3 yards/carry, 1 touchdown
 Passing: Alex Hornibrook – 13 completions, 20 passing attempts, 158 yards, 12.2 avg, 2 touchdowns, 1 interception
 Receiving: Kendric Pryor – 3 receptions, 63 yards (long 32), 21.0 avg
 Defense: Nick Nelson – 5 Tackles (5 solo), 1 tackle-for-loss for 3 yds, 4 pass breakups

Iowa

Statistical Leaders
 Rushing: Jonathan Taylor – 29 carries, 157 yards (long 19), 5.4 yards/carry
 Passing: Alex Hornibrook – 11 completions, 18 passing attempts, 135 yards, 12.3 avg, 2 touchdowns, 3 interceptions
 Receiving: Danny Davis – 4 receptions, 74 yards (long 28), 18.5 avg
 Defense: Ryan Connelly – 9 Tackles (6 solo), 2 tackles-for-loss for 14 yds, 1 sack for loss 12 yds, 1 forced fumble, 1 QB hurry

Michigan

Statistical Leaders
 Rushing: Jonathan Taylor – 19 carries, 132 yards (long 52), 6.9 yards/carry
 Passing: Alex Hornibrook – 9 completions, 19 passing attempts, 143 yards, 15.9 avg, 1 touchdown, 1 interception
 Receiving: A. J. Taylor – 3 receptions, 79 yards (long 51), 26.3 avg, 1 touchdown
 Defense: T. J. Edwards – 11 Tackles (7 solo), 2.5 tackles-for-loss for 12 yds, 1 sack for loss 10 yds, 1 pass breakup, 1 QB hurry

at Minnesota

Statistical Leaders
 Rushing: Jonathan Taylor – 20 carries, 149 yards (long 53), 7.5 yards/carry, 1 touchdown
 Passing: Alex Hornibrook – 15 completions, 19 passing attempts, 151 yards, 10.1 avg, 3 touchdowns
 Receiving: Danny Davis – 5 receptions, 41 yards (long 10), 8.2 avg, 1 touchdown
 Defense: Ryan Connelly – 6 Tackles (5 solo), 3.0 tackles-for-loss for 26 yds, 2 sacks for loss 24 yds

vs. Ohio State

The No. 3 Wisconsin Badgers (12-1, 9-0) were defeated by the No. 8 Ohio State Buckeyes (11-2, 8-1) 27-21 at Lucas Oil Stadium in the Big Ten Championship. Paul Chryst is now 0-2 versus the Buckeyes, and Urban Meyer is now 5-0 versus the Badgers, though two of the victories came in overtime. This was Wisconsin's fifth appearance in the Championship game, and their second straight and Ohio State's third.

Statistical Leaders
 Rushing: Jonathan Taylor – 15 carries, 41 yards (long 7), 2.7 yards/carry
 Passing: Alex Hornibrook – 19 completions, 40 passing attempts, 229 yards, 12.1 avg, 2 interceptions
 Receiving: Troy Fumagalli – 5 receptions, 45 yards (long 11), 9.0 avg
 Defense: Andrew Van Ginkel – 3 Tackles (1 solo), 1 forced fumble, 1 fumble recovery, 1 interception returned 9 yds for touchdown

vs. Miami (FL)

Rankings

Roster

Injuries 

At the start of the season four players were announced as out for the season due to injury; Senior ILB Jack Cichy (right knee), Freshman ILB Mason Stokke (right leg), Sophomore OLB Zack Baun (left foot), Freshman RB Sam Brodner (right knee).

2018 NFL Draft

2018 NFL Draft class

Signed undrafted free agents
 Garret Dooley, LB, Minnesota Vikings
 Alec James, DE, Arizona Cardinals
 Austin Ramesh, FB, Arizona Cardinals
 Connor Sheehy, DE, Green Bay Packers

References

Wisconsin
Wisconsin Badgers football seasons
Orange Bowl champion seasons
Wisconsin Badgers football